Amity International School, formerly the Pretoria Hindu School, is a private school in Erasmia, Pretoria, South Africa. It is associated with the Amity International Schools group.  The school caters for all classes starting from Grade R till Grade 7, and also has a range of sporting activities.

The school also offers exchange programs between the other campuses around the world, including France and Mauritius.

History 

Pretoria Hindu School, was a mainly Hindu based school catering to the largely Indian communities of Laudium and Erasmia. The school was run by the community and was known for its small classes. The school occupied its Erasmia campus and a part of the Shree Pretoria Hindu Seva Samaj(SPHSS) until 2005 when they finished construction on the extra classrooms at Erasmia campus.

In order for the school to grow its numbers, the name was changed to Trident College. The changing of the name had very little effect on the numbers of the school as many people still referred to the school as the Pretoria Hindu School, and still kept the idea that the school was predominantly for Hindus.

References

Private schools in Gauteng
Schools in Pretoria